The Hanged Man is a 2009 Spanish-Irish thriller and romantic drama film directed by Manuel Gómez Pereira which stars Clara Lago and Álvaro Cervantes.

Plot 
Set in 1989 Girona, the fiction tracks the romance between two childhood friends (Sandra and Álvaro), as the teenage years deepen the pre-existing relationship into something closer.

Cast

Production 
A Spanish-Irish co-production, the film was produced by Amigo PC, Lenon Producciones, Ovideo TV, and Subotica Entertainment, and it had the participation of TVE and TVC. Shooting locations included Girona, Barcelona, and Ireland.

Release 
Distributed by Sony Pictures Releasing, the film was theatrically released in Spain on 30 January 2009.

Reception 
Mirito Torreiro of Fotogramas rated the film 3 out of 5 stars, praising the director's change of register, also writing that the film "draws a more than convincing portrait of young people devoured by sexual awakening and the desire for possession".

Jonathan Holland of Variety deemed the "flawed but intriguing" film to be "a quietly intense thriller that sees the helmer abandoning his comedies" "for something meatier".

David Bernal of Cinemanía rated the film 2 out of 5 stars, deeming it to be a "flawed drama", also pointing out that, deep down, the authorship should be attributed to Salvador García Ruiz rater than to Gómez Pereira, as "everything in this provincial teenage romance narrated in fits and starts connects with [García Ruiz's] oppressive and intimate universe".

Accolades 

|-
| rowspan = "2" align = "center" | 2009 || rowspan = "2" | 23rd Goya Awards || Best New Actor || Álvaro Cervantes ||  || rowspan = "2" | 
|-
| Best Original Score || Bingen Mendizábal || 
|}

See also 
 List of Spanish films of 2009

References 

Films shot in Barcelona
Films shot in the province of Girona
Films shot in Ireland
Spanish thriller films
Irish thriller films
Spanish romantic drama films
Irish romantic drama films
2009 romantic drama films
2009 thriller films
Films based on Spanish novels
Films set in Catalonia
Films set in 1989
Films directed by Manuel Gómez Pereira
2000s Spanish-language films
2000s Spanish films